Order is one of the eight major hierarchical taxonomic ranks in Linnaean taxonomy. It is classified between family and  class.  In biological classification, the order is a taxonomic rank used in the classification of organisms and recognized by the nomenclature codes. An immediately higher rank, superorder, is sometimes added directly above order, with suborder directly beneath order. An order can also be defined as a group of related families.

What does and does not belong to each order is determined by a taxonomist, as is whether a particular order should be recognized at all. Often there is no exact agreement, with different taxonomists each taking a different position. There are no hard rules that a taxonomist needs to follow in describing or recognizing an order. Some taxa are accepted almost universally, while others are recognized only rarely.

The name of an order is usually written with a capital letter. For some groups of organisms, their orders may follow consistent naming schemes. Orders of plants, fungi, and algae use the suffix  (e.g. Dictyotales). Orders of birds and fishes use the Latin suffix  meaning 'having the form of' (e.g. Passeriformes), but orders of mammals and invertebrates are not so consistent (e.g. Artiodactyla, Actiniaria, Primates).

Hierarchy of ranks

Zoology
For some clades covered by the International Code of Zoological Nomenclature, several additional classifications are sometimes used, although not all of these are officially recognized.

In their 1997 classification of mammals, McKenna and Bell used two extra levels between superorder and order: grandorder and mirorder. Michael Novacek (1986) inserted them at the same position. Michael Benton (2005) inserted them between superorder and magnorder instead. This position was adopted by Systema Naturae 2000 and others.

Botany
In botany, the ranks of subclass and suborder are secondary ranks pre-defined as respectively above and below the rank of order. Any number of further ranks can be used as long as they are clearly defined.

The superorder rank is commonly used, with the ending  that was initiated by Armen Takhtajan's publications from 1966 onwards.

History
The order as a distinct rank of biological classification having its own distinctive name (and not just called a higher genus) was first introduced by the German botanist Augustus Quirinus Rivinus in his classification of plants that appeared in a series of treatises in the 1690s. Carl Linnaeus was the first to apply it consistently to the division of all three kingdoms of nature (then minerals, plants, and animals) in his Systema Naturae (1735, 1st. Ed.).

Botany

For plants, Linnaeus' orders in the Systema Naturae and the Species Plantarum were strictly artificial, introduced to subdivide the artificial classes into more comprehensible smaller groups.  When the word  was first consistently used for natural units of plants, in 19th-century works such as the Prodromus Systematis Naturalis Regni Vegetabilis of Augustin Pyramus de Candolle and the Genera Plantarum of Bentham & Hooker, it indicated taxa that are now given the rank of family. (See ordo naturalis, 'natural order'.)

In French botanical publications, from Michel Adanson's  (1763) and until the end of the 19th century, the word  was used as a French equivalent for this Latin . This equivalence was explicitly stated in the 's  (1868), the precursor of the currently used International Code of Nomenclature for algae, fungi, and plants.

Some of the plant families still retain the names of Linnaean "natural orders" or even the names of pre-Linnaean natural groups recognized by Linnaeus as orders in his natural classification (e.g. Palmae or Labiatae). Such names are known as descriptive family names.

Zoology
In zoology, the Linnaean orders were used more consistently. That is, the orders in the zoology part of the Systema Naturae refer to natural groups. Some of his ordinal names are still in use, e.g. Lepidoptera (moths and butterflies) and Diptera (flies, mosquitoes, midges, and gnats).

Virology
In virology, the International Committee on Taxonomy of Viruses's virus classification includes fifteen taxa to be applied for viruses, viroids and satellite nucleic acids: realm, subrealm, kingdom, subkingdom, phylum, subphylum, class, subclass, order, suborder, family, subfamily, genus, subgenus, and species. There are currently fourteen viral orders, each ending in the suffix .

See also
 Biological classification
 Cladistics
 Phylogenetics
 Taxonomic rank
 Systematics
 Taxonomy
 Virus classification

References

Works cited
 

01
Botanical nomenclature
Plant taxonomy
rank08
Bacterial nomenclature